Blastobasis commendata is a moth in the family Blastobasidae. It was described by Edward Meyrick in 1922. It is found in Brazil.

References

Blastobasis
Moths described in 1922